Leuschner may refer to:

 Leuschner Observatory
 Leuschner (crater)

People with the surname "Leuschner"
 Armin Otto Leuschner
 Friedrich Ludwig Leuschner, Politician in the Kingdom of Saxony
 Katerina Von Leuschner
 Lisa Leuschner
 Michael Leuschner
 Robert Lee "Skip" Leuschner Jr., Rear admiral, U.S. Navy (b. 1935)
 Wilhelm Leuschner
 William Leuschner

Surnames from given names